The Arabian golden sparrow (Passer euchlorus) is a sparrow found in south west Arabia and also the coast of Somalia and Djibouti where it occurs in thorn savannah and scrub habitats. It is sometimes considered as a subspecies of the Sudan golden sparrow (Passer luteus).

References

External links 

Arabian golden sparrow at the Internet Bird Collection

Arabian golden sparrow
Birds of the Horn of Africa
Birds of the Arabian Peninsula
Arabian golden sparrow
Arabian golden sparrow